Yvonne of the Night (Italian: Yvonne la Nuit) is a 1949 Italian melodrama film directed by Giuseppe Amato and starring Totò, Olga Villi, and Frank Latimore.

It was shot at the Cinecittà Studios in Rome. The film's sets were designed by the art director Gastone Medin.

Synopsis
The son of a count engages in a romantic relationship with a popular entertainer much to the disgust of his father. While the son is apparently killed fighting for Italy during the First World War, his pregnant lover gives birth to a child.

Cast 

 Totò as  Nino, il fantasista
 Olga Villi as Nerina Comi 
 Frank Latimore as Lt. Carlo Rutelli
 Giulio Stival as Count Rutelli 
 Eduardo De Filippo as Lawyer Rubini
 Gino Cervi as  Colonel Baretti
 Arnoldo Foà as Senator
 John Strange as Major Tremiti
 Ave Ninchi as Sora Rudegarda
 Paola Veneroni as Rosetta
 Mario Riva as Ragazzo delle sigarette
 Arturo Dominici as Official

References

External links

1949 films
Films directed by Giuseppe Amato
Italian black-and-white films
Italian historical drama films
1940s historical drama films
Films set in the 1910s
Films shot at Cinecittà Studios
Melodrama films
1940s Italian-language films
1940s Italian films